Christian II of Saxe-Merseburg (19 November 1653 – 20 October 1694), was a duke of Saxe-Merseburg and member of the House of Wettin.

He was the second (but eldest surviving) son of Christian I, Duke of Saxe-Merseburg, and Christiana of Schleswig-Holstein-Sonderburg-Glücksburg.

Life
The death of his older brother Johann Georg on 3 January 1654 made him the new heir of the duchy of Saxe-Merseburg. Christian succeeded his father when he died, on 18 October 1691.

Christian II's short reign had little impact on the history of the duchy. In fact, he is only remembered today for one of the obelisks in the gardens of Castle Merseburg, where he appears together with his wife.

Marriage and issue

In Moritzburg an der Elster on 14 October 1679, Christian married his paternal cousin, Princess Erdmuthe Dorothea of Saxe-Zeitz. They had seven children:

Christian III Maurice, Duke of Saxe-Merseburg (b. Merseburg, 7 November 1680 – d. Merseburg, 14 November 1694).
Johann Wilhelm (b. Merseburg, 11 October 1681 – d. Merseburg, 29 May 1685).
August Frederick (b. Delitzsch, 10 March 1684 – d. Merseburg, 13 August 1685).
Philipp Ludwig (b. Merseburg, 3 November 1686 – d. Merseburg, 9 June 1688).
Maurice Wilhelm, Duke of Saxe-Merseburg (b. Merseburg, 5 February 1688 – d. Merseburg, 21 April 1731).
Frederick Erdmann (b. Merseburg, 20 September 1691 – d. Köthen, 2 June 1714), married on 15 February 1714 to Eleonore Wilhelmine of Anhalt-Köthen. The union lasted only four months and was childless.
Christiane Eleonore Dorothea (b. Merseburg, 6 November 1692 – d. Merseburg, 30 March 1693).

References 
 Heinrich Theodor Flathe: Christian II. (Herzog von Sachsen-Merseburg). In: Allgemeine Deutsche Biographie (ADB). Band 4, Duncker & Humblot, Leipzig 1876, S. 175.

1653 births
1694 deaths
House of Saxe-Merseburg
Dukes of Saxe-Merseburg
Albertine branch